Walter Bathurst (1764?–20 October 1827), was a captain in the British Royal Navy who was killed at the Battle of Navarino.

Biography
His father was one of the thirty-six children of Sir Benjamin Bathurst MP, the younger brother of Allen, first Earl Bathurst. One of his uncles was Dr. Henry Bathurst, bishop of Norwich.

In April 1791 was appointed to the brig  on the home station. He continued in her for nearly three years, and on 30 December 1793 was appointed to the frigate , in which he served on the Newfoundland Station, and afterwards with the fleet off Cadiz under Lord St. Vincent.

His promotion was not confirmed until 24 October 1799; but he continued to command the Ville de Paris until May 1800, and for a great part of the time with Lord St. Vincent's flag at the main. Having brought home the Pitt, rechristened , he still commanded her in the Baltic in 1808, and in July 1809 was employed in escorting part of Lord Chatham's army to Walcheren. The following year he was appointed to the 74-gun ship  in which he went out to the Mediterranean, and stayed there until the end of the war.

He had no further service until 1824, when he commissioned the 74-gun Genoa which, on 20 October 1827, formed part of the fleet commanded by Sir Edward Codrington at Navarino. The accident of position caused the Genoas loss to be very heavy; her list of killed considerably exceeded that of any other ship in the fleet, and included Bathurst. Codrington wrote a personal letter of condolence to Bathurst's widow, the mother of five children. One of these, following his father's steps, entered the navy, and had attained the rank of commander, when he died at a comparatively early age.

References

1764 births
1827 deaths
Royal Navy officers
British military personnel killed in action
Walter
British military personnel of the Greek War of Independence
Royal Navy personnel of the American Revolutionary War
Royal Navy personnel of the French Revolutionary Wars
Royal Navy personnel of the Napoleonic Wars